Molinadendron hondurense is a species of plant in the family Hamamelidaceae. It is endemic to Honduras.

References

Hamamelidaceae
Endemic flora of Honduras
Critically endangered flora of North America
Plants described in 1944
Taxonomy articles created by Polbot